Salthill and Monkstown railway station serves the areas of Salthill (on the coast) and Monkstown (just inland) in Dún Laoghaire–Rathdown, Ireland.

It is situated between Seapoint and Dún Laoghaire DART stations. The station has a car park, ticket office, automated ticket and vending machines. The ticket office is open between 05:45-00:15 AM, Monday to Sunday.

History
The original Salthill station opened in May 1837. It was built by the Dublin and Kingstown Railway. It closed in 1960 and was electrified and reopened in 1984 with the arrival of DART services.

Transport services 
There is no direct public transport to or from the station. The nearest bus stops are in Monkstown village, located less than 300 m from the station, which are served by the following:

Dublin Bus Routes:

 7 / 7A from Mountjoy Square to Bride's Glen / Loughlinstown. Route 7 provides a connection to the Luas Green Line terminus at Bride's Glen
 7N Nitelink from Dublin city centre to Shankill, via Blackrock (Fri & Sat only)

Private Operators

 Aircoach route 703 from Killiney to Dublin Airport, via Monkstown

There is also a taxi rank in Monkstown village and a large car park adjacent to the station

See also 
 List of railway stations in Ireland

References

External links 
Irish Rail Salthill and Monkstown Station Website

Iarnród Éireann stations in Dún Laoghaire–Rathdown
1837 establishments in Ireland

Railway stations in the Republic of Ireland opened in 1837